This is a list of the National Register of Historic Places listings in Laramie County, Wyoming. It is intended to be a complete list of the properties and districts on the National Register of Historic Places in Laramie County, Wyoming, United States. The locations of National Register properties and districts for which the latitude and longitude coordinates are included below, may be seen in a map.

There are 55 properties and districts listed on the National Register in the county, 3 of which are National Historic Landmarks.  One property was listed but has since been removed.

Current listings

|}

Former listings

|}

See also 

 List of National Historic Landmarks in Wyoming
 National Register of Historic Places listings in Wyoming

References 

Laramie